The 1956 National League Division One was the 22nd season and eleventh post-war season of the highest tier of motorcycle speedway in Great Britain.

Summary
The league consisted of seven teams after the West Ham Hammers ceased competitive speedway racing at the end of 1955. Poole Pirates came up from the second tier to replace them. Match line-ups were increased to eight riders after a single season with seven riders. Wimbledon won their third successive National League Championship.

Norwich Stars rider Malcolm Flood died on 2 April, at Poole. The 25-year-old rider suffered fatal injuries despite an earlier warning from the race steward that he was riding too erratically into the bends.

Final table

Top Ten Riders (League only)

National Trophy Stage Two
The 1956 National Trophy was the 19th edition of the Knockout Cup. The Trophy consisted of two stages; stage one was for the second tier clubs, stage two was for the top tier clubs. Wimbledon won the second and final stage and were therefore declared the 1956 National Trophy champions.

 For Stage One - see Stage One

First round

Semifinals

Final

First leg

Second leg

Wimbledon were National Trophy Champions, winning on aggregate 108–107.

See also
 List of United Kingdom Speedway League Champions
 Knockout Cup (speedway)

References

Speedway National League
1956 in speedway
1956 in British motorsport